Hurricane Gordon developed during a fourteen-day period along an erratic, persistent, and highly unusual path. The hurricane formed near Panama in the southwestern Caribbean on November 8, 1994. As a tropical depression, it brushed Nicaragua and spent several days in the waters off the country's coast. Strengthening slightly into a tropical storm, Gordon wound its way north into the Greater Antilles. Despite warm waters, persistent wind shear prevented significant strengthening. Executing a slow turn to the north and then the northwest, Gordon made two more landfalls, on eastern Jamaica and eastern Cuba, while delivering tremendous rains to western Hispaniola.

As Gordon made its fourth landfall crossing the Florida Keys, it interacted with a cyclone in the upper-troposphere  and a series of cyclonic lows which lent the storm some sub-tropical characteristics. After a few days as an unusual hybrid of a tropical and a subtropical system in the Gulf of Mexico, the storm re-claimed its fully tropical form and made yet another landfall, this time across the Florida peninsula, and continued into the Atlantic Ocean. In the Atlantic, Gordon rapidly strengthened to a Category 1 hurricane. Gordon's characteristic wandering briefly brought it near North Carolina, but ultimately the storm headed south, weakening into a minor tropical storm before making its sixth and final landfall on Florida's east coast.

Hurricane Gordon was the seventh named storm and third hurricane of the 1994 Atlantic hurricane season. Although it never made landfall as a hurricane, in its meandering course the storm included six separate landfalls: four as a tropical storm and two as a tropical depression. Three of its landfalls were in the U.S. state of Florida.

Formation
During the first week of November 1994, a large area of disturbed weather developed just north of Panama over the southwestern Caribbean Sea. A tropical wave passed through the area and gave it mild convection. A second wave passed through the area on November 6 and introduced cyclonic circulation to the disturbance. Over the next two days, the system gradually organized and sparked a deep convection off Nicaragua's southeast coast. Moving northwest, the storm began to slowly strengthen and its upper-level outflow became favorable to further development. Spots of convection flared on the morning of November 9;  banding features appeared as its center made landfall on the northeastern Nicaraguan coast near Puerto Cabezas. A full day later a trough to the storm's northwest over the Gulf of Mexico moved the depression offshore, to the northeast, and over the warm waters of the western Caribbean Sea. Fueled by these warm waters, on the night of November 9, it strengthened into Tropical Storm Gordon with  winds.

Lacking firm movement because of weak steering currents, Gordon meandered north-northeast in the presence of mild west-southwesterly wind shear, unable to strengthen under the adverse conditions. The trough continued steering Gordon, bending it eastward towards Jamaica on the afternoon on November 12.

Through the Greater Antilles

November 13 was an active day for Tropical Storm Gordon. The trough over southern Florida and the Gulf of Mexico continued to push Gordon eastward towards Jamaica. In the pre-dawn hours, the storm clipped the eastern edge of the island,  leaving  of rainfall. Southwesterly wind shear kept the storm from developing beyond , but neither the shear nor the landfall significantly disrupted the cyclone's organization. Accelerating, Gordon turned towards the northeast. Continued shear prevented the upper-level development needed for typical cyclonic organization, but a strong lower-level circulation had formed. The center crossed near Guantánamo Bay and the storm dumped heavy rainfall as it passed over the eastern portion of the island; even heavier rain fell in Haiti to the west, where  of rain was recorded at Camp-Perrin.

Meanwhile, the broad-scale circulation that was covering most of the Caribbean Sea (of which Tropical Storm Gordon was only a part) was interacting with an upper-tropospheric trough near the Straits of Florida. This trough strengthened the broad upper-level cyclone, which in turn strengthened Gordon and spawned several other low-level circulations in the western Caribbean Sea. When Gordon crossed eastern Cuba, the National Hurricane Center determined that it had become the most dominant of these low-level systems and had absorbed their convections.  (Meteorologist Jose Fernandez-Partagas voiced the minority opinion that Gordon's circulatory center had dissipated over Cuba and that a low-pressure system near the Bahamas was now the dominant system, which would have meant the demise of Tropical Storm Gordon and the emergence of a new tropical storm. While possible, this view was not accepted by the official hurricane summaries.) By nightfall of November 13, Gordon had not only made two landfalls and survived interactions with three competing systems but also, in assimilating the Bahamian low, had gained the cool central core typical of a subtropical cyclone.

The deep-layered cyclone within which Gordon was embedded steered the storm west-northwest, south of Turks and Caicos and the Bahamas, on November 14. A large ridge of high-pressure near the U.S. Mid-Atlantic coast increased the pressure gradient around the storm, so although its sub-tropical elements (namely a lack of deep convection) precluded a core of strong winds immediately around the storm's nucleus, strong winds were supported outside the storm's circulatory center. These winds inched up to  but did not strengthen any further. The ridge continued to steer the hybrid Tropical/Subtropical Storm Gordon west-northwestward past the western Bahamas. This brought the southern portion of the storm's circulation over northern Cuba, while the strengthening northern circulation produced  winds near Palm Beach. The storm's fourth landfall occurred on November 15 when Gordon passed over the Florida Keys near Key West, Florida. The storm then continued west over the lower Keys and into the Straights of Florida, where the storm's center began to warm and deep convection signaled the return of Gordon's purely tropical characteristics.

Second Florida landfall and peak strength

Steering currents remained weak giving the storm a chance to fully re-develop its deep convection while immobile at sea. During this time, Tropical Storm Gordon began to spawn tornadoes. As the storm center was well offshore most were probably unreported, but six tornadoes touched down on the Florida coast.

After stalling offshore for almost a day, a mid- to upper-tropospheric trough over the central U.S. slowly pulled Tropical Storm Gordon northward then north-northeastward towards Florida's west coast. The storm made landfall between Ft. Myers and Naples with  winds. The storm barely weakened as it crossed the landmass keeping its  winds. Crossing the peninsula in a mere six hours, the storm continued to pick up speed. Early on November 17, back over the open ocean, the storm's central pressure began to fall. Improved organization was not apparent and wind shear was pulling at the core of the deep convection when, on November 17, Gordon suddenly spawned  winds and was upgraded to a Category 1 hurricane.

Third Florida landfall and demise

The shortwave trough that had been steering Gordon across Florida moved ahead of the storm and its influence was replaced by a mid-tropospheric ridge over the eastern United States. The hurricane's loop continued, and as it moved to a west-northwesterly heading Gordon briefly threatened North Carolina's Outer Banks before stalling offshore once again. In the presence of weak steering currents once again, Gordon lost strength and slipped back to tropical storm status with  winds. In its brush with the Mid-Atlantic States, Gordon dropped  with a maximum of  recorded at Norfolk, Virginia. Warm waters improved its organization, but this did not result in stronger winds and the storm continued to weaken. Strong upper-level winds battered the storm from the northwest. They sheared away Gordon's upper-level convection while polluting the storm with colder and drier air that weakened its lower level convection.

A high-pressure system over the central United States drifted east and added a westward component to Gordon's southward motion, pulling the storm southwest towards Florida. The persistent shear and a continued lack of deep convection eventually reduced the storm's winds to below tropical storm force, and on the morning on November 20, Gordon became a tropical depression. Between its three Floridian landfalls, Hurricane Gordon dumped  of rain on Florida, with a station at Cooperstown recording . The storm moved northward across Florida, northeastward across Georgia, and finally merged with a frontal system over South Carolina.

Track and forecasting
Gordon's track was likened to Hurricane Dawn in 1972. The National Hurricane Center described the storm as "a complex system, [which] followed an unusual, erratic path over the western Caribbean Sea and islands, Florida and the southwestern Atlantic." Due to the path, the agency had difficulties in forecasting Gordon, and the forecast errors were 10% to 30% above the average of the previous decade.

See also

 1994 Atlantic hurricane season
 List of Atlantic hurricanes
 Timeline of the 1994 Atlantic hurricane season

References

External links

 NHC Tropical Cyclone Report on Hurricane Gordon
 HPC Report on Gordon's Rainfall
 Hurricane Gordon 1994
 NOAA: The Retirement of Hurricane Names
 Weather Underground: Haiti's Hurricane History 

Gordon (1994)
1994 Atlantic hurricane season